Francis Raymond Scully (27 January 1920 – 12 August 2015), Australian politician, from 1949 was a member of the Victorian Legislative Assembly for the electoral district of Richmond representing the Labor Party to March 1955. He was Assistant Minister of Lands, Assistant Minister of Electrical Undertakings in the third Cain government from 1952 to 1955. He was a member of the Catholic Social Studies Movement ("The Movement") in Victoria, and was expelled from the ministry and the ALP as part of the  Australian Labor Party split of 1955. He then was a member of the Australian Labor Party (Anti-Communist) (and then the Democratic Labor Party) from 1955 to 1958. Scully was the only member of the DLP in the lower house of the Victorian parliament during these three years.

Scully was a railway worker, and was active in the Australian Railways Union Industrial Group. Scully was defeated at the 1958 elections and subsequently owned a news-agency in Sandringham, Victoria. He died in 2015 at the age of 95.

References

1920 births
2015 deaths
Members of the Victorian Legislative Assembly
Australian Labor Party members of the Parliament of Victoria
Democratic Labor Party (historical) politicians
Victoria (Australia) state politicians
People from Bendigo
Australian Labor Party (Anti-Communist) members of the Parliament of Victoria